Mad Dog Coll is a 1992 film directed by Greydon Clark. It stars Christopher Bradley and Bruce Noizick. It was released in the United States on home video as Killer Instinct.

Plot
Vincent Coll starts off as a New York street-fighter, and moves quickly all the way up to being a criminal kingpin in the mafia, and engages in a  
turf war with fellow mobster, Dutch Schultz.

Cast
 Christopher Bradley as Vincent 'Mad Dog' Coll
 Jeff Griggs as Peter Coll
 Bruce Noizick as Dutch Schultz
 Rachel York as Lotte
 Eddie Bowz as Joey Noe
 Jack Conley as Owen 'Owney The Killer' Madden
 Guy D'Alema as Mr. Gotti
 Anna Garduno as Rosie
 Matt Servitto as Charlie 'Lucky' Luciano
 Andrey Podoshian as Barelli

See also
 Mad Dog Coll (1961 film)

References

External links

American crime films
American biographical films
Films set in the 1920s
Films set in the 1930s
Films set in New York (state)
1992 films
Films directed by Greydon Clark
1992 crime drama films
Biographical films about contract killers
Biographical films about Depression-era gangsters
Biographical films about gangsters
Cultural depictions of Lucky Luciano
Cultural depictions of Dutch Schultz
Cultural depictions of Mad Dog Coll
1990s English-language films
Films produced by Menahem Golan
Films scored by Terry Plumeri
1990s American films